Gaoming Temple is a Buddhist temple located in Tiantai County, Zhejiang, China.

History
The temple traces its origins to the former "Youxi Daochang", founded by master Zhiyi in the 6th century, and would later become the "Gaoming Temple" in the Tianyou period (904–907) of the Tang dynasty (618–907).

In 936, in the 3rd year of Qingtai period (934–936) in the Later Tang dynasty (923–937), the temple was renamed "Zhizhe Youxi Tayuan"

In 1008, in the 1st year of Dazhong Xiangfu period in the Song dynasty (960–1279), the name was changed into "Jingming Temple".

In 1606, in the reign of Wanli Emperor (1573–1620) in the Ming dynasty (1368–1644), master Chuandeng resided in the temple, where he disseminated Tiantai Buddhism. To commend his contribution, he had been honored as "Rebirth of Zhiyi".

In 1926, abbot Guantong restored the Hall of Ksitigarbha, Drum tower and Hall of Four Heavenly Kings.

The modern temple was founded in 1980. In 1981, under the support of overseas Chinese Xia Jingshan and Zhou Qinli, abbot Juehui refurbished and redecorated the temple.

Gaoming Temple has been designated as a National Key Buddhist Temple in Han Chinese Area by the State Council of China in 1983.

Architecture
Along the central axis are the Shanmen, Four Heavenly Kings Hall, Mahavira Hall, Guanyin Hall and Buddhist Texts Library. There are over eight halls and rooms on both sides, including Guru Hall, Drum tower, Abbot Hall, Monastic Dining Hall, Monastic Reception Hall and Meditation Hall.

Gallery

References

Buddhist temples in Taizhou, Zhejiang
Buildings and structures in Taizhou, Zhejiang
Tourist attractions in Taizhou, Zhejiang
1980 establishments in China
19th-century Buddhist temples
Religious buildings and structures completed in 1980
Tiantai County
Tiantai temples